Paeniglutamicibacter psychrophenolicus is a Gram-positive, non-spore-forming, aerobic, rod-coccus, facultatively psychrophilic and non-motile bacterium from the genus Paeniglutamicibacter which has been isolated from an alpine ice cave in Salzburg, Austria.

References

External links
Type strain of Paeniglutamicibacter psychrophenolicus at BacDive -  the Bacterial Diversity Metadatabase

Bacteria described in 2004
Micrococcaceae